"Peacekeeper" is a song by Fleetwood Mac, written by guitarist and vocalist Lindsey Buckingham, from the 2003 album Say You Will. It was the first and most commercially successful single released from the album.

This was also the band's 25th, and most recent song to debut in the U.S. Billboard Hot 100. This was also Buckingham's first US hit since "Family Man", which peaked at #90 in 1988.

Background
"Peacekeeper" was written in 2000 three years before the release of Say You Will in a house Buckingham was renting with his wife. Warner Bros selected the song as Say You Will's first single, describing the song as "walking a line between something quite modern and something quite familiar".

"Peacekeeper" entered the US charts at #93 on 29 March. Seven weeks later, the song reached its peak position of #80. By the time "Peacekeeper" exited the charts, it had tallied eleven consecutive weeks on the Billboard Hot 100. In New Zealand, the single proved to be more successful, eventually reaching #31 on the New Zealand Singles Chart. On the other hand, it failed to chart in the UK.

Lyrics
The radio edit differs slightly from the album version. The radio edit replaces the line "only kill" with "break their will." The latter lyrics are used during live performances.

When asked about the lyrics, he explained that the song had little to do with global issues or war, but rather aimed to close in on US propaganda, and also explored the idea of working towards peace on a continual basis. He changed his tune in a later interview though, where he spoke of people becoming unaffected and unmoved by the turmoil and disasters around the world. "...It's about how we are becoming increasingly desensitized to things around the world that are brutal and not standing up for human value..."

Other appearances
To promote their new album Say You Will, "Peacekeeper" was played on the NBC TV show Third Watch.  Fleetwood Mac also performed the song on both Late Night with David Letterman and the Tonight Show with Jay Leno.

"Peacekeeper" appeared on both setlists for the Say You Will Tour. The song was also included on their live album Live in Boston. A different live recording of "Peacekeeper" was included on the limited deluxe edition of Say You Will, which included a total of four bonus tracks. "Peacekeeper" would later make it onto all editions of 50 Years – Don't Stop in 2018.

"Peacekeeper" was one of the songs performed on Sound Stage Presents – Lindsey Buckingham with Special Guest Stevie Nicks. The concert aired in 2005 on PBS.

Personnel
Lindsey Buckingham – guitars, keyboards, percussion, vocals
Stevie Nicks – vocals
Mick Fleetwood – drums, percussion
John McVie – bass guitar
John Shanks – guitar

Track listing
Reprise CD single PR03903 (Warner)

"Peacekeeper" (Single Remix) – 4:11
"Peacekeeper" (Single Edit) – 3:42

Chart positions

See also
 List of anti-war songs

References

Fleetwood Mac songs
2003 songs
Songs written by Lindsey Buckingham
Reprise Records singles